Mancopter is a video game developed by Nichibutsu USA and published by Datasoft for the Commodore 64 in 1984. It was programmed by Scott Spanburg, and the music was composed by John A. Fitzpatrick. The player controls a person piloting a helicopter-like flying device over an ocean competing with computer-controlled pilots.

Gameplay
The player flies the copter by rapidly pressing the fire button on the joystick.  If the player stops pressing the button, or runs into some sort of obstacle, then the copter falls into the sea.  For a few of these falls, the player is saved by a whale who surfaces with the copter on its head and allows the player to continue the game.  If the player runs out of "Fish," (which can be stolen or recaptured from flying pelicans,) then a Jaws-inspired shark eats the player instead and the game is over.

Reception
Compute!'s Gazette called Mancopter "challenging enough for adults and picturesque enough for children ... The game is challenging and graphically entertaining".

References

External links

Mancopter screenshots

1984 video games
Air racing video games
Commodore 64 games
Commodore 64-only games
Datasoft games
Video games developed in the United States
Single-player video games